Pitshanger (sometimes referred to as Pitshanger Village) is a small but busy local suburb, centred on the shops in Pitshanger Lane, located about 1 mile north of Ealing Broadway in west London. First mentioned in 1493, possibly meaning an area of sloped woodland frequented by birds. It contains numerous small independent shops, several cafes, two pubs, two churches, a school, and a park (Pitshanger Park), and is often taken to also include parts of the nearby Brentham Garden Suburb.

Amenities 

Pitshanger Lane (originally Pitshanger Road) is one of the busiest roads in Ealing, and provides a wide range of shops. The Pitshanger Village Library has recently been improved and the Lane is furnished with touch-screen computers. A Methodist and an Anglican church are both located at the end of the Lane. Due to its large size and possession of a Bösendorfer  grand piano, St. Barnabas (Church of England) is the venue for, besides the usual services, a series of classical music concerts given by local musicians and others. These include regular recitals every Friday lunchtime. Attendance is free with a retiring collection. The current vicar of St Barnabas is Father Justin Dodd; the Director of Music is Kavi Pau and the Assistant Director of Music is Henry Tozer who runs a gospel choir. Away from Pitshanger Lane, the Pitshanger area features Pitshanger Park, which includes allotments for locals' use. Featuring two children's playground areas, football goalposts, a bowling green and several tennis courts, Pitshanger Park caters for both children and adults.

Schooling also exists on Pitshanger Lane, with North Ealing Primary School located at one end of the Lane. The school is a comprehensive, co-education school for pupils up to the age of eleven. St. Gregory's R.C. School is also coeducational and located just off Pitshanger Lane.

In May 2016, Pitshanger Lane was named London's best high street by The Great British High Street, and a plaque was unveiled.

Transport
The area is served by buses E2 and E9 and night bus N7.

Gallery

References

Further reading 

  Ealing and Brentford: Manors, A History of the County of Middlesex: Volume 7: Acton, Chiswick, Ealing and Brentford, West Twyford, Willesden (1982), pp. 123–28. Date accessed: 11 May 2007.

External links 
 Pitshanger Village on hidden-london.com
 Pitshanger Community Association
 Pitshanger Allotments Conservation Association
 Pitshanger Football Club
  Pitshanger Stories - an AV record of Pitshanger Life
 ealingtontoday.co.uk

Areas of London
Districts of the London Borough of Ealing
Places formerly in Middlesex